Morten Thorsby (born 5 May 1996) is a Norwegian professional footballer who as a midfielder plays for Bundesliga side Union Berlin and the Norway national team.

Club career

Stabæk
Thorsby started his youth career in IL Heming but joined FK Lyn in 2009. While playing in Lyn he was drafted into the boys-15 national team. In 2012, he joined the youth ranks of Stabæk.

He made his first team debut in the 2013 1. Divisjon, as a substitute in four matches. Stabæk was promoted, and he made his first-tier debut in April 2014 against Molde.

SC Heerenveen
On 2 June 2014, Thorsby signed a five-year contract with Eredivisie side SC Heerenveen.

Sampdoria
On 11 January 2019, Thorsby signed a four-year pre-contract with Serie A side Sampdoria. The contract will run through the 2023 season. He joined the club on 1 July 2019. He made his debut on 4 November in the 1–0 away win against SPAL, in which he played the full match. After that game he slowly rose in the team's hierarchy, becoming a starter in midfield alongside Albin Ekdal. On 21 June 2020, he scored his first goal for Sampdoria scoring the 2–1 consolation goal in the away defeat to Inter Milan.

The following year, he was confirmed as a starter alongside Ekdal, and he scored 3 goals in 35 total appearances.

The day before the start of the 2021–22 season, Thorsby decided to change his jersey number from 18 to 2 to raise awareness about the Paris Agreement – the number 2 signifying the first aim of the agreement to hold "the increase in the global average temperature to well below 2 °C".

Union Berlin
On 19 July 2022, German club Union Berlin announced Thorsby's signing.

Personal life
Thorsby is known for his commitment to environmentalism and is an advocate for stronger actions on climate change. He established the We Play Green foundation to encourage the football community to adopt environmentally friendly initiatives, and has met with municipal and national leaders in Italy while at Sampdoria in support of improved climate policy. In August 2021, he switched his shirt number to 2 to raise awareness of climate change. The digit represents the target of the internationally-adopted Paris Agreement of keeping global warming "well below" 2 °C above pre-industrial times, in order to avoid dangerous levels of climate change. He was named 'Young Athlete of The Year' at The BBC Green Sport Awards 2022.

Career statistics

Club

International

References

1996 births
Living people
Footballers from Oslo
Association football midfielders
Norwegian footballers
Norway international footballers
Norway under-21 international footballers
Norway youth international footballers
Stabæk Fotball players
SC Heerenveen players
U.C. Sampdoria players
1. FC Union Berlin players
Norwegian First Division players
Eliteserien players
Eredivisie players
Serie A players
Norwegian expatriate footballers
Norwegian expatriate sportspeople in the Netherlands
Expatriate footballers in the Netherlands
Norwegian expatriate sportspeople in Italy
Expatriate footballers in Italy
Norwegian expatriate sportspeople in Germany
Expatriate footballers in Germany
Climate activists
Norwegian environmentalists